Dale M. Krentz (born December 19, 1961) is a Canadian former ice hockey player who played 30 games in the National Hockey League with the Detroit Red Wings between and 1987 and 1989. The rest of his career, which lasted from 1985 to 1996, was spent in the minor leagues and then in Europe. Krentz played at the collegiate level for Michigan State.

Career statistics

Regular season and playoffs

References

External links
 

1961 births
Living people
Adirondack Red Wings players
Adler Mannheim players
Canadian ice hockey left wingers
Detroit Red Wings players
HC Thurgau players
Ice hockey people from Manitoba
Michigan State Spartans men's ice hockey players
Selkirk Steelers players
SC Bern players
Sportspeople from Steinbach, Manitoba
Starbulls Rosenheim players
Undrafted National Hockey League players